Stoneywood is a small village which lies in the Falkirk council area of Scotland.

The village is located south of the River Carron along the B818 road on the outskirts of the town of Denny. 
At the time of the 2001 census the village had a population of 288 residents.

References

External links

Canmore - Carrongrove Paper Mills site record
Central Scotland Forest - Carron Glen SSSI

Villages in Falkirk (council area)
Denny, Falkirk